Oomycota forms a distinct phylogenetic lineage of fungus-like eukaryotic microorganisms, called oomycetes. They are filamentous and heterotrophic, and can reproduce both sexually and asexually. Sexual reproduction of an oospore is the result of contact between hyphae of male antheridia and female oogonia; these spores can overwinter and are known as resting spores. Asexual reproduction involves the formation of chlamydospores and sporangia, producing motile zoospores. Oomycetes occupy both saprophytic and pathogenic lifestyles, and include some of the most notorious pathogens of plants, causing devastating diseases such as late blight of potato and sudden oak death. One oomycete, the mycoparasite Pythium oligandrum, is used for biocontrol, attacking plant pathogenic fungi. The oomycetes are also often referred to as water molds (or water moulds), although the water-preferring nature which led to that name is not true of most species, which are terrestrial pathogens.

Oomycetes were originally grouped with fungi due to similarities in morphology and lifestyle. However, molecular and phylogenetic studies revealed significant differences between fungi and oomycetes which means the latter are now grouped with the stramenopiles (which include some types of algae). The Oomycota have a very sparse fossil record; a possible oomycete has been described from Cretaceous amber.

Etymology 
Oomycota comes from the Greek ωόν (oon, 'egg') and μύκητας (mykitas, 'fungus'), referring to the large round oogonia, structures containing the female gametes, that are characteristic of the oomycetes. 

The name "water mold" refers to their earlier classification as fungi and their preference for conditions of high humidity and running surface water, which is characteristic for the basal taxa of the oomycetes.

Morphology 
The oomycetes rarely have septa (see hypha), and if they do, they are scarce, appearing at the bases of sporangia, and sometimes in older parts of the filaments. Some are unicellular, while others are filamentous and branching.

Classification 

Previously the group was arranged into six orders.
 The Saprolegniales are the most widespread. Many break down decaying matter; others are parasites.
 The Leptomitales have wall thickenings that give their continuous cell body the appearance of septation. They bear chitin and often reproduce asexually.
 The Rhipidiales use rhizoids to attach their thallus to the bed of stagnant or polluted water bodies.
 The Albuginales are considered by some authors to be a family (Albuginaceae) within the Peronosporales, although it has been shown that they are phylogenetically distinct from this order.
 The Peronosporales too are mainly saprophytic or parasitic on plants, and have an aseptate, branching form. Many of the most damaging agricultural parasites belong to this order.
 The Lagenidiales are the most primitive; some are filamentous, others unicellular; they are generally parasitic.

However more recently this has been expanded considerably.
 Anisolpidiales Dick 2001
 Anisolpidiaceae Karling 1943
 Lagenismatales Dick 2001
 Lagenismataceae Dick 1995
 Salilagenidiales Dick 2001
 Salilagenidiaceae Dick 1995
 Rozellopsidales Dick 2001
 Rozellopsidaceae Dick 1995
 Pseudosphaeritaceae Dick 1995
 Ectrogellales
 Ectrogellaceae
 Haptoglossales
 Haptoglossaceae
 Eurychasmales
 Eurychasmataceae Petersen 1905
 Haliphthorales 
 Haliphthoraceae Vishniac 1958
 Olpidiopsidales
 Sirolpidiaceae Cejp 1959
 Pontismataceae Petersen 1909 (contains Petersenia , Pontisma 
 Olpidiopsidaceae Cejp 1959
 Atkinsiellales
 Atkinisellaceae
 Crypticolaceae Dick 1995
 Saprolegniales
 Achlyaceae
 Verrucalvaceae Dick 1984
 Saprolegniaceae Warm. 1884 [Leptolegniaceae]
 Leptomitales
 Leptomitaceae Kuetz. 1843 [Apodachlyellaceae Dick 1986]
 Leptolegniellaceae Dick 1971 [Ducellieriaceae Dick 1995]
 Rhipidiales
 Rhipidiaceae Cejp 1959
 Albuginales
 Albuginaceae Schroet. 1893
 Peronosporales [Pythiales; Sclerosporales; Lagenidiales]
 Salisapiliaceae
 Pythiaceae Schroet. 1893 [Pythiogetonaceae; Lagenaceae Dick 1994; Lagenidiaceae; Peronophythoraceae; Myzocytiopsidaceae Dick 1995]
 Peronosporaceae Warm. 1884 [Sclerosporaceae Dick 1984]

Phylogenetic relationships

Internal

External

This group was originally classified among the fungi (the name "oomycota" means "egg fungus") and later treated as protists, based on general morphology and lifestyle. A cladistic analysis based on modern discoveries about the biology of these organisms supports a relatively close relationship with some photosynthetic organisms, such as brown algae and diatoms. A common taxonomic classification based on these data, places the class Oomycota along with other classes such as Phaeophyceae (brown algae) within the phylum Heterokonta.

This relationship is supported by a number of observed differences between the characteristics of oomycetes and fungi. For instance, the cell walls of oomycetes are composed of cellulose rather than chitin and generally do not have septations. Also, in the vegetative state they have diploid nuclei, whereas fungi have haploid nuclei. Most oomycetes produce self-motile zoospores with two flagella. One flagellum has a "whiplash" morphology, and the other a branched "tinsel" morphology. The "tinsel" flagellum is unique to the Kingdom Heterokonta. Spores of the few fungal groups which retain flagella (such as the Chytridiomycetes) have only one whiplash flagellum. Oomycota and fungi have different metabolic pathways for synthesizing lysine and have a number of enzymes that differ. The ultrastructure is also different, with oomycota having tubular mitochondrial cristae and fungi having flattened cristae.

In spite of this, many species of oomycetes are still described or listed as types of fungi and may sometimes be referred to as pseudo fungi, or lower fungi.

Biology

Reproduction 

Most of the oomycetes produce two distinct types of spores. The main dispersive spores are asexual, self-motile spores called zoospores, which are capable of chemotaxis (movement toward or away from a chemical signal, such as those released by potential food sources) in surface water (including precipitation on plant surfaces). A few oomycetes produce aerial asexual spores that are distributed by wind. They also produce sexual spores, called oospores, that are translucent, double-walled, spherical structures used to survive adverse environmental conditions.

Ecology and pathogenicity 

Many oomycetes species are economically important, aggressive algae and plant pathogens. Some species can cause disease in fish, and at least one is a pathogen of mammals. The majority of the plant pathogenic species can be classified into four groups, although more exist.

 The Phytophthora group is a paraphyletic genus that causes diseases such as dieback, late blight in potatoes (the cause of the Great Famine of the 1840s that ravaged Ireland and other parts of Europe), sudden oak death, rhododendron root rot, and ink disease in the European chestnut
 The paraphyletic Pythium group is more prevalent than Phytophthora and individual species have larger host ranges, although usually causing less damage. Pythium damping off is a very common problem in greenhouses, where the organism kills newly emerged seedlings. Mycoparasitic members of this group (e.g. P. oligandrum) parasitize other oomycetes and fungi, and have been employed as biocontrol agents. One Pythium species, Pythium insidiosum, also causes Pythiosis in mammals.
 The third group are the downy mildews, which are easily identifiable by the appearance of white, brownish or olive "mildew" on the leaf undersides (although this group can be confused with the unrelated fungal powdery mildews).
 The fourth group are the white blister rusts, Albuginales, which cause white blister disease on a variety of flowering plants. White blister rusts sporulate beneath the epidermis of their hosts, causing spore-filled blisters on stems, leaves and the inflorescence. The Albuginales are currently divided into three genera, Albugo parasitic predominantly to Brassicales, Pustula, parasitic predominantly to Asterales, and Wilsoniana, predominantly parasitic to Caryophyllales. Like the downy mildews, the white blister rusts are obligate biotrophs, which means that they are unable to survive without the presence of a living host.

References

External links 
Description of The Phylum Oomycota – Systematic Biology
Introduction to the Oomycota – University of California Museum of Paleontology (UCMP)
Genome sequence and analysis of the Irish potato famine pathogen Phytophthora infestans